The Knowledge Navigator is a concept described by former Apple Computer CEO John Sculley in his 1987 book, Odyssey: Pepsi to Apple. It describes a device that can access a large networked database of hypertext information, and use software agents to assist searching for information.

Videos
Apple produced several concept videos showcasing the idea. All of them featured a tablet style computer with numerous advanced capabilities, including an excellent text-to-speech system with no hint of "computerese", a gesture based interface resembling the multi-touch interface later used on the iPhone and an equally powerful speech understanding system, allowing the user to converse with the system via an animated "butler" as the software agent.

In one vignette a university professor returns home and turns on his computer, in the form of a tablet the size of a large-format book. The agent is a bow-tie wearing butler who appears on the screen and informs him that he has several calls waiting. He ignores most of these, from his mother, and instead uses the system to compile data for a talk on deforestation in the Amazon Rainforest. While he is doing this, the computer informs him that a colleague is calling, and they then exchange data through their machines while holding a video based conversation.

In another such video, a young student uses a smaller handheld version of the system to prompt him while he gives a class presentation on volcanoes, eventually sending a movie of an exploding volcano to the video "blackboard". In a final installment a user scans in a newspaper by placing it on the screen of the full-sized version, and then has it help him learn to read by listening to him read the scanned results, and prompting when he pauses.

Credits
The videos were funded and sponsored by Bud Colligan, Director of Apple's higher education marketing group, written and creatively developed by Hugh Dubberly and Doris Mitsch of Apple Creative Services, with technical and conceptual input from Mike Liebhold of Apple's Advanced Technologies Group and advice from Alan Kay, then an Apple Fellow. The videos were produced by The Kenwood Group in San Francisco and directed by Randy Field. The director of photography was Bill Zarchy. The post-production mix was done by Gary Clayton at Russian Hill Recording for The Kenwood Group. The product industrial design was created by Gavin Ivester and Adam Grosser of Apple design.

Samir Arora, a software engineer at Apple was involved in R&D on application navigation and what was then called hypermedia. He wrote an important white paper entitled “Information Navigation: The Future of Computing". While working for Apple CEO John Sculley at the time, Arora built the technology to show fluid access to linked data displayed in a friendly manner an emerging area of research at Apple.

The Knowledge Navigator video premiered in 1987 at Educom, the leading higher education conference, in a keynote by John Sculley, with demos of multimedia, hypertext and interactive learning directed by Bud Colligan.

The music featured in this video is Georg Anton Benda's Harpsichord Concerto in C.

Reception
The software agent in the video has been discussed in the domain of human–computer interaction. It was criticized as being an unrealistic portrayal of the capacities of any software agent in the foreseeable future, or even in a distant future.

Some visions put forth by proponents of the Semantic Web have been likened to that of the Knowledge Navigator by Marshall and Shipman, who argue that some of these visions "ignore the difficulty of scaling knowledge-based systems to reason across domains, like Apple's Knowledge Navigator," and conclude that, as of 2003, "scenarios of the complexity of [a previously quoted] Knowledge Navigator-like approach to interacting with people and things in the world seem unlikely."

Siri

The notion of Siri was firmly planted at Apple 25 years ago though “Knowledge Navigator” with the voice of the assistant was only a concept prototype. In one of the videos, a man is seen asking the assistant to search for an article published 5 years before his time, the assistant finds it and tells the article being dated to 2006, and due to this we can conclude that the video is set to take place in September 2011. In October 2011, Apple relaunched Siri, a voice activated personal assistant software vaguely similar to that aspect of the Knowledge Navigator just a month after their initial prediction.

See also 
 "1984" (advertisement)
 Artificial intelligence
 Clippy
 Dynabook
 Hyperland
 Knowledge visualization
 Memex
 Office of the future
 Starfire video prototype
 Technological singularity

References

External links 
 The entire "professor" video (5 min 45 s)
 "Future Shock" a similar video, also made by Apple (11 min 54 s)

History of human–computer interaction
Hypertext
Tablet computers
User interfaces